Nick Gilliam (born December 27, 1978) is an American professional golfer.  Gilliam is best known for winning the individual NCAA Division I Men's Golf Championship in 2001.

Early years 
Gilliam was born in Green Bay, Wisconsin.  He attended Preble High School in Green Bay until halfway through his junior year, when he moved to Gainesville, Florida to complete his final year and a half of high school.  Gilliam was recognized as a Florida Academic Scholar and graduated from Gainesville High School.

College career 
Gilliam began his collegiate career at the University of North Carolina in Chapel Hill, North Carolina, where he played for the North Carolina Tar Heels men's golf team for a single semester.  He then transferred to the University of Florida in Gainesville, where he played for coach Buddy Alexander's Florida Gators men's golf team in NCAA competition from 1998 to 2001.  As a senior in 2001, he was the captain and statistical leader of the Gators men's golf team that won the NCAA Division I Men's Golf Championship.  Gilliam shot a final-round score of 71 to win the individual NCAA championship with a 72-hole total of 276 (-12).  He was also a three-time All-Southeastern Conference (SEC) academic selection (1999, 2000, 2001), and was recognized as an All-American in 2001.

Professional career 
Gilliam turned professional in 2001 and has played mostly on lower level tours. He has competed in a handful of tournaments on the PGA Tour and the second-tier Nationwide Tour.  He qualified for the 2005 U.S. Open, but missed the cut.

Results in major championships

See also 

List of Florida Gators golfers
List of University of Florida alumni

References

External links 
Nick Gilliam Yahoo! Sport profile

Florida golf profile

American male golfers
Florida Gators men's golfers
Golfers from Wisconsin
Sportspeople from Green Bay, Wisconsin
1978 births
Living people